The eighth South American Chess Championship (Torneo Sudamericano) took place in Montevideo, Uruguay, from 7th to 25th of March 1938. The event was held in an elegant seaside resort Carrasco, one of the most expensive neighborhoods in Montevideo, located on the city's southeast coast.

The results and standings:

References

 Héctor Silva Nazzari "Ajedrez Uruguayo (1880-1980)" 

Chess competitions
Chess in Uruguay
1938 in chess
1938 in Uruguayan sport
1930s in Montevideo
Sports competitions in Montevideo
March 1938 sports events